Zulfia Nazir Ahmed  (born 30 May 1999) is a football player from Pakistan. She is member of the National team for whom she plays as a midfielder.

Background
Zulfia belongs to a Kho Dardic Indo-Aryan Family From Gilgit-Baltistan region of the country.Her Mother tongue is Khowar and she is also fluent in Shina, Urdu and English.

Career

National
She plays as a midfielder for her club. Since 2021, she is playing for Karachi United. Earlier she played for Balochistan United and Punjab.

Karachi United
She debuted for Karachi United in their first match of the 2021 National Women Football Championship in Karachi against Karachi W.F.C. in which she scored 10 goals.

International
In October 2014, as preparation for the SAFF Championships, she participated in a three match friendly series against hosts, Bahrain. In November, she participated in the 3rd SAFF Women's Championship held in Islamabad, where she played in all three of Pakistan's games.

Honours
National Women Football Championship: 2014

References

1999 births
Pakistani women's footballers
Pakistan women's international footballers
Living people
Balochistan United W.F.C. players
Women's association football midfielders